Puliyantivu or Puliyanthivu or Puliyantheevu is the name of several islands in Sri Lanka, including: 

 Puliyantivu (Batticaloa), an island in Batticaloa District
 Puliyantivu (Jaffna), an island in Jaffna District